The National Institute of Health Research and Development (abbreviated as Balitbangkes) was a supporting unit of the Ministry of Health which is responsible for state research, development, and innovation in the field of health and medical sciences. The agency dissolved and liquidated into National Research and Innovation Agency (BRIN) on 31 December 2021 as part of BRIN state research activity integration plan.

History

Formation 
Before Balitbangkes existed, the agency was preceded by four Health Laboratories under the Indonesian Department of Health formed in 1950-1960s, three were soon founded after the end of Indonesian National Revolution: Institute for People's Food in Bogor (researched human nutrition), Central Institute for Investigation and Eradication of Venereal Diseases in Surabaya (researched transmission and eradication of sexually transmitted diseases and venereal diseases), and Tawangmangu Hortus Medicus in Karanganyar (researched traditional herbal medicines and remedies and collection of medicinal plants), and the last was 1969 founded National Research Institute of Department of Health. The National Research Institute of Department of Health was the direct preceding agency of the current Balitbangkes after consolidating three 1950s founded Health Laboratories and expanded it with additional laboratories that subsequently formed.

By decree, the agency was founded by President Suharto, on 26 August 1974 through issuance of Presidential Decision No. 45/1974, along with other ten research and development agencies founded by this Decision. However, at that time, the agency was still existed on paper and physically inexistent. After procuring enough resources and assets, the agency finally came into being on 12 December 1975 thru Ministry of Health Decree No. 114/1975 and named as Badan Penelitian dan Pengembangan Kesehatan or colloquially abbreviated as Balitbangkes.

Role in COVID-19 Pandemic Situation in Indonesia 
Balitbangkes play significant role in COVID-19 pandemic situation in Indonesia. Balitbangkes play roles in development measures and policies to control COVID-19, and surveilling local variants and SARS-CoV-2 viral evolution in Indonesia thru Whole Genome Sequencing equipments owned by the agency. Balitbangkes and its child agencies also performed 24 ongoing nation-wide multidisciplinary COVID-19 observation studies across Indonesia.

Integration to BRIN and Dissolution 
In response of formation of National Research and Innovation Agency as independent agency under the President of Indonesia, the Ministry of Health rearranged their research and development activities which had been long exercised by its Balitbangkes. In the plan, announced on 23 September 2021, Balitbangkes will be transformed into Agency for Health Policies Development (Indonesian: Badan Kebijakan Pembangunan Kesehatan, BKPK), a regulatory agency intended to provide only policies and standards making for state health activity, no longer doing research as the research part will be relinquished to BRIN.

On 7 November 2021, the Ministry issued order to Balitbangkes and its child agencies to halt their activities per 31 December 2021 as unit under auspices of Ministry of Health, effectively started the dismantlement of Balitbangkes. In the order, Balitbangkes will split into three parts: one part (which is the most) relinquished to BRIN, one part to become BKPK, and the rest of the Balitbangkes part in regional level will be relinquished to local government where the Balitbangkes branch formerly existed for being transformed into local-government run public health laboratories for being integrated as part of state public health laboratories system.

In 30 November 2021, BRIN announced that a research organization tentatively named Health and Nutrition Research Organization (Indonesian: Organisasi Riset Kesehatan dan Gizi, ORKG), transformation of the previously from Balitbangkes of will be activated and operated. The successor of Balitbangkes, later named as Health Research Organization (Indonesian: Organisasi Riset Kesehatan, OR Kesehatan) formed officially on 1 March 2022 and functional on 4 March 2022.

Structure 
The Structure of Balitbangkes is as follows:

 Office of the Head of Balitbangkes
 Office of the Secretary of Balitbangkes
 Subdivision of General Administration Affairs
 Center for Biomedical and Basic Medical Technologies Research and Development (Center No.1)
 Division of General Administration Affairs
 Subdivision of Programs and Cooperation
 Subdivision of Finance, Employment, and General Affairs
 Division of Biomedical Sciences
 Subdivision of Communicable Diseases
 Subdivision of Non-Communicable Diseases
 Division of Health Basic Technologies
 Subdivision of Biological-based Products
 Subdivision of Instruments and Diagnostic Products
 Bacteriology Laboratory
 BSL-3 Laboratory
 Immunology Laboratory
 Virology Laboratory
 Stem Cell Laboratory
 Nutrition and Food Laboratory
 Pharmaceutical Chemistry Laboratory
 Parasitology Laboratory
 Testing Animal Laboratory
 Center for Health Resources and Health Service Research and Development (Center No. 2)
 Subdivision of General Administration Affairs
 Division of Administration Development
 Subdivision of Development for Human Resources and Financing of Health Researches, Developments, and Assessments
 Division of Health Resources Development
 Subdivision of Health Resources Development
 Subdivision of Pharmaceuticals and Medical Devices
 Subdivision of Health Human Resource Development
 Division of Health Services Development
 Subdivision of Primary Health Services and Health Referral Services
 Subdivision of Traditional Health Services and Health Supporting Services
 Center for Public Health Efforts Research and Development (Center No. 3)
 Division of Diseases Prevention and Control
 Subdivision of Non-Communicable Diseases and Mental Health
 Subdivision of Communicable Diseases
 Division of Public Health
 Subdivision of Nutrition and Family Health
 Subdivision of Community Health
 Division of General Administration Affairs
 Subdivision of Finance, Employment, and General Affairs
 Subdivision of Programs and Cooperation
 Center for Humanities and Health Management Research and Development (Center No. 4)
 Division of Health Humanities
 Subdivision of Law and Ethics
 Subdivision of Social and Cultural Affairs
 Division of Health Management
 Subdivision of Funding
 Subdivision of Policy Analysis
 Division of General Administration Affairs
 Subdivision of Finance, Employment, and General Affairs
 Subdivision of Programs and Cooperation
 Indonesian Center for Research and Development of Disease Vectors and Reservoirs
 Subdivision of General Administration Affairs
 Division of Administration Development
 Subdivision of Development for Human Resources and Financing of Health Researches, Developments, and Assessments
 Division of Programs, Cooperation, and Information Networking
 Subdivision of Programs and Evaluation of Researches, Developments, and Assessments Activities
 Subdivision of Cooperation and Networking
 Division of Experimental Services and Equipment
 Subdivision of Technical Support
 Subdivision of Research and Development Equipment
 Virology Laboratory
 Bacteriology Laboratory
 Parasitology Laboratory
 Disease Vectors Reference Collection Laboratory
 Disease Reservoirs Reference Collection Laboratory
 Histopathology Laboratory
 Insecticide Testing Laboratory
 Botanical Pesticide Testing Laboratory
 Health Behavior and Health Promotion, Epidemiology, GIS, and Biostatistical Laboratory
 Environmental Laboratory
 Testing Animal Laboratory
 Hybridoma Technology Laboratory
 Insectarium and Biocontrol Laboratory
 Indonesian Center for Research and Development of Medicinal Plants and Traditional Medicine
 Division of General Administration Affairs
 Subdivision of General Affairs
 Subdivision of Finance
 Division of Programs, Cooperation, and Information Networking
 Subdivision of Programs and Evaluation
 Subdivision of Cooperation and Information Networking
 Division of Experimental Services and Equipment
 Subdivision of Technical Support
 Subdivision of Research and Development Equipment
 Plant Systematic Laboratory
 Galenic Formulation Laboratory
 Phytochemistry Laboratory
 Formulation Laboratory
 Microbiology Laboratory
 Plant Tissue Culture Laboratory
 Biomolecular Laboratory
 Jamu Scientification Clinic Laboratory
 Postharvest Laboratory
 Pest and Plant Disease Control Laboratory
 Pharmacology Laboratory
 Medicinal Plants Cultivation Laboratory
 Class I Center for Health Research and Development Magelang (Nutrition Science)
 Class I Center for Health Research and Development Donggala (Schistosomiasis Investigation and Control)
 Class I Center for Health Research and Development Banjarnegara (Leptospirosis Investigation and Control)
 Class II Center for Health Research and Development Tanah Bumbu (Fasciolopsis Investigation and Control)
 Class II Center for Health Research and Development Papua (Leprosy Investigation and Control)
 Class II Center for Health Research and Development Baturaja (Filariasis Investigation and Control)
 Class II Center for Health Research and Development Aceh (Tuberculosis Investigation and Control)
 Pangandaran Malaria Research Station, Pangandaran
 Waikabubak Arbovirosis Research Station, Waikabubak, East Nusa Tenggara

References 

Science and technology in Indonesia
Medical and health organizations based in Indonesia
Government agencies of Indonesia
Research institutes in Indonesia
1975 establishments in Indonesia
2021 disestablishments in Indonesia
COVID-19 pandemic in Indonesia